The Simca Poissy engine, commonly known as the Simca 1100 engine, was a four-cylinder Overhead valve engine developed by Simca for use in its superminis and economy cars, designed by the engineer Georges Martin (V12 Matra Sports engine designer). In spite of its common name, the engine actually predates the Simca 1100 model, and debuted in 1961 in the Simca 1000 Coupé. It was developed and produced by Simca (subsequently rebranded as Talbot) in the late 1960s at the manufacturer's factory in Poissy, hence its name.

The engine was first designed in a  form, but was reduced and stretched in order to be used in a variety of models and versions, by Simca, the Rootes Group (its partner company in Chrysler Europe), Simca's final incarnation Talbot and its last parent company Peugeot, who used it until 1991 in its midsize model, the 309.

Peugeot eventually dropped the engines, replacing them with their own TU family.

Poissy engine

The Poissy engine was introduced in 1961 in the Simca 1000, a small four-door saloon car.

The overhead valve engine Type 315 was a modern unit, with a water-cooled inline design with forged crankshaft, alloy cross-flow head and five main bearings. An unusual feature on early models was the absence of a spin-on paper oil filter. Instead, the engine featured a form of centrifugal oil filter in the hollow rear crankshaft pulley, although all later versions used the more traditional disposable cartridge filters. One of its major innovations was the use of a swirl vortex on the intake valve port which gave very good combustion, and thus both power and economy for this time. This engine proved cheap to build, and several models of different sizes and market segments used this displacement, which survived until 1982, as the ever-present entry level for the Simca 1100.

In later life however, when it was installed in cars such as the Horizon and 1307/Alpine/Solara the Poissy engine was criticized for its poor mechanical refinement - in particular for its excessive tappet noise, something which led to poor press reviews. It survived as the entry level engine in the Peugeot 309 until 1991.

Smaller variants

The Poissy engine was reduced a few times, although it didn't have much use apart from the early and more compact models. In 1964, Simca developed an  version for the Spanish market 1000, as cars over 0.9 L were in a higher tax bracket. An even more economic version was created for the entire European market in late 1968, with only . These displacements were used in the Simca 1000 up to 1978.

Larger variants

In 1968, another version was created for the Spanish market, the  displacement. A double-barrel carburetor was then used in the Simca 1200 S, a coupé designed by Bertone, and the CG sports car, and could reach . The regular version was later used in various models around the European market, and was even installed in the US-market version of the Simca 1100, known as the Simca 1204. It was in use until 1978.

The  variant appeared in 1967, initially in the 1100 and then in the 1000. This proved to be one of the most popular displacements of the 315 engines, powering the LCV version of the 1100, known as VF2, and the Talbot Horizon's entry level version. It survived until 1991, when it was used as the base model to the Peugeot 309.

The  variant debuted in 1972, and although it wasn't very popular in the 1000, it continued to be used in various Simca and Talbot models.

The  variant was first used in 1975 in the Simca 1307/Chrysler Alpine. On virtue of its size, it could reach  with a double-barrel carburetor, but unlike the 1.3 L version, it was never used for racing in any capacity, Simca and Talbot preferring to use it in its larger models, including deluxe versions of the Horizon and the Solara. It also powered Europe's first soft-roader, the Matra Rancho.

The larger iteration of the Poissy engine was the  variant. Like the 1.45 L engine, it debuted in the 1307/Alpine in 1975, and was positioned at the top of the range, initially only with an automatic transmission (the only version of the engine to feature one), necessary to ensure this engine could power the US-market versions of the Chrysler Europe models. It was notorious for its use in the Dodge Omni and Plymouth Horizon, and was dubbed Peugeot by the American media, despite the fact that Peugeot had nothing to do with its design. It was also used as the base engine for the three-seater coupé Matra Murena.

Different models

777 cc
This tiny model was a tax special introduced in late 1968 to fit the Simca 1000 into France's 4CV tax category. The engine code is type 359.

Simc'4 - 1968-1978

844 cc
This "tax special" was only offered in the Spanish market, where cars of over  received a heavy tax penalty. It was called the Simca 900. The car was introduced in 1970 with a  engine.

Simca 900 - 1970-1977 (Spain)

944 cc
Introduced for longitudinal applications (for the rear-engined 1000 range), this engine was called the 315. In 1968 a version for transverse installation (for the new front-wheel drive 1100) called the type 352 was introduced. Some of its improvements were also applied to the original version, which now carried the 349 code. In 1973, Simca changed their engine coding system and the longitudinal engine now became the 1D1 while the transverse model became the 3D1.

Simca 1000 Coupé - 1961-1966
Simca 1000 - 1962-1978
CG 1000 - 1966-1974
Simca 1100 - 1968-1976

1118 cc
When installed in Peugeots, it was called the E1A engine. Originally it was called the type 350 (for transversal installations) or 351 (for longitudinal ones). These became the 3E1 and 1E1 respectively in 1973.

Simca 1000 - 1968-1978
Simca 1100 - 1967-1982
Simca-Talbot Horizon - 1977-1987
Peugeot 205 - July 1987 - October 1988, some Spanish built XL/GL models
Peugeot 309 - 1986-1989
Citroen C15 - 1987-1988

1204 cc
Originally fitted to the somewhat sporting 1100 Spécial, it carried the 353 engine code. The rear-engined (longitudinal) version was called the 354. Later the engine code was changed to 1F1 (for single carburettor versions), and after PSA's takeover it was briefly installed in Spanish market 205s where it was called the F1.

Simca 1000 GT, Rallye GT, Special (Spain only)
Simca 1200S Bertone - 1968-1971
Simca CG - 1967-1974
Simca 1100 - 1967-1979
Simca VF2 - 1973-1985
Peugeot 205 - 1987-1990, Spain only
Peugeot 309 - Spain only

1294 cc
The  iteration was introduced in 1971, replacing the earlier  unit used. The engine code was 366 for transversal installations, while longitudinal engines were called type 371. In 1973, Simca changed their system and the engines became 3G (transversal) and 1G (longitudinal) instead. After PSA began to closer combine their operations with those of the erstwhile Simca corporation, the engine code was changed yet again, to G1A, for use in the 309 and late Horizons. The 1978-only Simca 1000 Rallye III had the most potent unit yet, the 1G4C.

Simca 1000 - 1972-1974
Simca Rallye - 1972-1978
Simca 1100 Special/TI - 1971-1982
Simca 1307 / Chrysler Alpine / Talbot 1510 - 1975-1982
Matra Bagheera - 1973-1976
Simca-Talbot Horizon - 1977-1985
Talbot Solara - 1980-1985
Peugeot 205 - Spanish-built XR/GR models
Peugeot 309 - 1986-1990
Citroen C15 - 1987-1988

1442 cc
Introduced in 1975, this larger model carries the 6Y engine code. The 6Y1 has a single carburettor. while the 6Y2 has a double barrel one, and the 6Y4 has twin, double-barrel carbs.

Simca 1200 - Spain, 1979-1980
Simca 1307 / Chrysler Alpine / Talbot 1510 - 1975-1983
Matra Bagheera - 1976-1980
Matra Rancho - 1977-1982
Simca-Talbot Horizon - 1977-1987
Talbot Solara - 1980-1986
Peugeot 309 GR - Spain, - 1985-1989
Peugeot 205 - some Spanish built models

1592 cc
This engine was known as the 6J internally. 6J1 engines have a single carburettor, while 6J2s have a twin unit. The slightly more powerful version at  fitted to the Murena is called the 6J2A.

Simca 1307 / Chrysler Alpine / Talbot 1510 - 1975-1984
Matra Murena - 1980-1983
Simca-Talbot Horizon - 1983-1987
Dodge Omni / Plymouth Horizon - 1983-1986
Talbot Solara - 1980-1986
Peugeot 205 GTX (Spain, 1987 - October 1991)

References

See also
List of Chrysler engines

Simca engines
Gasoline engines by model
Poissy
Products introduced in 1967
Straight-four engines